Isa Golik (also Romanized as ‘Īsá Golīk; also known as ‘Īsá Gūlī) is a village in Chaldoran-e Jonubi Rural District, in the Central District of Chaldoran County, West Azerbaijan Province, Iran. At the 2006 census, its population was 667, in 119 families.

References 

Populated places in Chaldoran County